The Ida Rieu School for the blind and deaf was founded in 1922 in Karachi, Pakistan. It was named after Ida Augusta Rieu, the wife of the Commissioner of Sindh, J.L.Rieu.

Ida Rieu not only has a school for people with disabilities but also has a hostel, a college, and an old persons' home.

The Governor of Sindh, Ishrat-ul-Ibad Khan, lauded the services rendered by the Ida Rieu Poor Welfare Association's School for the Deaf and Blind over the past 80 years.

A large number of philanthropists support the school, which not only provides educational facilities but also imparts vocational training to the disabled students.

In 2006, five students, including four women, gained admission to the master's degree programme at the Ida Rieu College for the blind and the deaf. This is the first time that the institution had introduced a masters' level programme under the arts faculty at the University of Karachi.

On average, 12–16 students from Ida Rieu, including women, sit in the HSC exams; while another 10 or more, in the degree level exams. Some of the school's students have also earned top positions in the examinations. Qudsia Khan is the principal of the school.

In 2007, the blind students of Ida Rieu School achieved brilliant results in the Matriculation Examination. Ten blind girl students appeared, out of which three obtained first division and one the first class first position. Amongst the boys, nine appeared and three obtained first division. The overall result of both was 100 per cent. In 2008, there were over 900 blind and deaf students at the institution.

it has undertaken to provide the latest modified gadgets to allow the inclusion into information society i.e., Braille keyboards, screens, voice activated devices, special videos, and toys that promoted learning for children with varying degrees of blindness.

Prominent students
 Safira Bibi, public speaker
 Noman Ahmed, founder, Maestro Life and Relationship Management
Abid ali, first prize in the Jinnah interschool debate competition

External links
 Ida Rieu Welfare Association Website

Schools in Karachi
Educational institutions established in 1923
1923 establishments in India
Schools for the deaf
Schools for the blind